Pierre Jean Marie Laval (28 June 1883 – 15 October 1945) was a French politician. During the Third Republic, he served as Prime Minister of France from 27 January 1931 to 20 February 1932 and 7 June 1935 to 24 January 1936. He again occupied the post during the German occupation, from 18 April 1942 to 20 August 1944.

A socialist early in his life, Laval became a lawyer in 1909 and was famous for his defence of strikers, trade unionists and leftists from government prosecution. In 1914, he was elected to the Chamber of Deputies as a member of the Socialist Party, and he remained committed to his pacifist convictions during the First World War. After his defeat in the 1919 election, Laval left the Socialist Party and became mayor of Aubervilliers. In 1924 he returned to the Chamber as an independent, and was elected to the Senate three years later. He also held a series of governmental positions, including Minister of Public Works, Minister of Justice and Minister of Labour. In 1931, Laval became Prime Minister, but his government fell only a year later.  

Laval joined the conservative government of Gaston Doumergue in 1934 and served as Minister of the Colonies and then Foreign Minister. In 1935, Laval again became Prime Minister. Seeking to contain Germany, he pursued foreign policies favourable to Italy and the Soviet Union, but his handling of the Abyssinia Crisis, which was widely denounced as appeasement of Benito Mussolini, prompted his resignation in 1936.

After France's defeat and armistice with Germany in 1940, Laval served in prominent roles in Philippe Pétain's Vichy France, first as the vice-president of the Council of Ministers from July 1940 to December 1940 and later as the head of government from April 1942 to August 1944. The collaborationist government provided French labourers for Germany and organised the deportation of Jews.

After the Liberation of France in 1944, Laval was imprisoned by the Germans. In April 1945, he fled to Spain but soon returned to France, where he was arrested by the French government under Charles de Gaulle. After what has been described as a flawed trial, Laval was found guilty of plotting against the security of the state and of collaboration with the enemy. After a thwarted suicide attempt, Laval was executed by firing squad in October 1945.

Laval's manifold political activities left a complicated and controversial legacy, which resulted in more than a dozen conflicting biographies of him.

Early life
Pierre Jean Marie Laval was born on 28 June 1883 in Châteldon, near Vichy in the northern part of Auvergne, the son of Gilbert Laval and Claudine Tournaire. His father worked as a café proprietor and postman. The family was comfortably off compared to the rest of the village: the café also served as a hostel and a butcher's shop, and Gilbert Laval owned a vineyard and horses. The last name "Laval" was widespread in the region at that time. The family branch was commonly named Laval-Tournaire, and his father had himself called "Baptiste Moulin".

Laval was educated at the village school in Châteldon. At age 15, he was sent to the lycée Saint-Louis in Paris where he obtained his baccalauréat in July 1901. He then continued his studies in Southwestern France, in Bordeaux and Bayonne, where he learnt Spanish and met Pierre Cathala. Returning to Lyon, he spent the next year reading for a degree in zoology and served as a supervisor in various collèges and lycées of Lyon, Saint-Étienne and Autun to pay for his studies.

Laval joined the socialist Central Revolutionary Committee in 1903, while he was living in Saint-Étienne, 55 km (34 mi) southwest of Lyon. During this period, Laval became familiar with the left-wing doctrines of Georges Sorel and Hubert Lagardelle. "I was never a very orthodox socialist", he declared more than forty years later in 1945, "by which I mean that I was never much of a Marxist. My socialism was much more a socialism of the heart than a doctrinal socialism ... I was much more interested in men, their jobs, their misfortunes and their conflicts than in the digressions of the great German pontiff."

In 1903, he was called up for military service and, after serving in the ranks, was discharged for varicose veins. Laval returned to Paris in 1907 at the age of 24. In April 1913 he said that "barrack-based armies [were] incapable of the slightest effort, because they are badly-trained and, above all, badly commanded." Laval favoured abolition of the army and replacement by a citizens' militia.

Lawyer

Abandoning natural science studies, Laval eventually turned to law and became in 1909 a "lawyer of the poor people", who was near syndicalists of the CGT. The years before the First World War were characterised by labour unrest, and Laval defended strikers, trade unionists and left-wing agitators against government attempts to prosecute them. At a trade union conference, Laval said:

The first case that led him to fame was the acquittal of Gustave Manhès, a revolutionary trade unionist who had been charged with possession of explosives and anarchist manuals.

Laval married Jeanne Claussat in 1909, the daughter of the Socialist politician Dr Joseph Claussat. Their only child, a daughter named Josée, was born in 1911. Josée married René de Chambrun, whose uncle, Nicholas Longworth III, married Alice Roosevelt, the daughter of US President Theodore Roosevelt. Although Laval's wife came from a political family, she never participated in politics. Laval was generally considered to be devoted to his family. 

In 1911, he stood for the National Assembly in the Neuilly-Boulogne electoral district and caused the conservative candidate Édouard Nortier to win since Laval stood in the second round despite the Radical candidate, Alexandre Percin, doing so as well.

First World War

Socialist deputy for Seine
In April 1914, as fear of war swept the nation, the Socialists and Radicals geared up their electoral campaign in defence of peace. Their leaders were Jean Jaurès and Joseph Caillaux. The Bloc des Gauches ("Lefts Bloc") denounced the law passed in July 1913 that extended compulsory military service from two to three years.

In the 1914 legislative election, held three months before the outbreak of World War I, the trade unions sought Laval as the Socialist candidate for the Seine, the district comprising Paris and its suburbs. Laval was elected to the Chamber of Deputies in the second electoral district of Saint-Denis. At nearly 31, he was the youngest member of the Chamber.

The Radicals, with the support of Socialists, held the majority in the French Chamber of Deputies. Together, they hoped to avert war, but the assassination of Archduke Franz Ferdinand of Austria on 28 June 1914 and of Jaurès on 31 July 1914 shattered those hopes. Laval's brother, Jean, died in the first months of the war.

Laval was listed in the Carnet B, a compilation of potentially subversive elements that might hinder mobilisation. In the name of national unity, Minister of the Interior Jean-Louis Malvy, despite pressure from chiefs of staff, refused to have anyone apprehended. Laval remained true to his pacifist convictions during the war. In December 1915, Jean Longuet, the grandson of Karl Marx, proposed to Socialist parliamentarians that they communicate with socialists of other states in the hope of pressing governments into a negotiated peace. Laval signed on, but the motion was defeated.

With France's resources geared for war, goods were scarce or overpriced. On 30 January 1917, in the National Assembly Laval called upon Supply Minister Édouard Herriot to deal with the inadequate coal supply in Paris. When Herriot said, "If I could, I would unload the barges myself", Laval retorted, "Do not add ridicule to ineptitude". Those words delighted the Assembly and attracted the attention of Georges Clemenceau but left the relationship between Laval and Herriot permanently strained.

Stockholm, "polar star"
Laval scorned the conduct of the war and the poor supply of troops in the field. When mutinies broke out after General Robert Nivelle's offensive of April 1917 at Chemin des Dames, he spoke in defence of the mutineers. When Marcel Cachin and Marius Moutet returned from St. Petersburg in June 1917 with the invitation to a socialist convention in Stockholm, Laval saw a chance for peace. In an address to the Assembly, he urged the chamber to allow a delegation to go: "Yes, Stockholm, in response to the call of the Russian Revolution.... Yes, Stockholm, for peace.... Yes, Stockholm the polar star."  The request was denied.

The hope of peace in spring 1917 was overwhelmed by discovery of traitors, some real and some imagined, as with Malvy, who became a suspect because he had refused to arrest Frenchmen on the Carnet B. Laval's "Stockholm, étoile polaire" speech had not been forgotten. Many of Laval's acquaintances, the publishers of the anarchist Bonnet rouge and other pacifists were arrested or interrogated. Though Laval frequented pacifist circles (it was said that he was acquainted with Leon Trotsky), the authorities did not pursue him. His status as a deputy, his caution and his friendships protected him. In November 1917, Clemenceau became Prime Minister and offered Laval a post in his government. Laval refused, as the Socialist Party refused to enter any government, but he questioned the wisdom of such a policy in a meeting of Socialist deputies.

Initial postwar career

From Socialist to Independent
In the 1919 elections the Socialists' record of pacifism, their opposition to Clemenceau and anxiety arising from the excesses of the Bolshevik Revolution in Russia contributed to their defeat by the conservative National Bloc. Laval lost his seat in the Chamber of Deputies.

The General Confederation of Labour (Confédération Générale du Travail - CGT), with 2,400,000 members, launched a general strike in 1920, which petered out with thousands of workers being laid off. In response, the government sought to dissolve the CGT. Laval, with Joseph Paul-Boncour as chief counsel, defended the union's leaders and saved the union by appealing to Interior Minister Théodore Steeg and Commerce and Industry Minister Auguste Isaac.

Laval's relations with the Socialist Party drew to an end. The last years with the Socialist caucus, combined with the party's disciplinary policies, eroded Laval's attachment to the cause. With the Bolshevik victory in Russia, the party was changing. At the Congress of Tours in December 1920, the Socialists split into two ideological components: the French Communist Party (SFIC, later PC-SFIC), which was inspired by Moscow, and the more moderate French Section of the Workers' International (SFIO). Laval let his membership lapse and did not take sides as both factions battled over the legacy of Jean Jaurès.

Mayor of Aubervilliers
In 1923, Aubervilliers, north of Paris, needed a mayor. As a former deputy of the constituency, Laval was an obvious candidate. To be eligible for election, Laval bought farmland, Les Bergeries. Few were aware of his defection from the Socialists. Laval was also asked by the local SFIO and Communists to head their lists. Laval chose to run under his own list of former Socialists whom he had convinced to leave the party and to work for him. The independent Socialist Party of sorts existed only in Aubervilliers. In a four-way race, Laval won in the second round. He served as mayor of Aubervilliers until just before his death.

Laval won over those whom he had defeated by cultivating personal contacts. He developed a network among the humble and the well-to-do in Aubervilliers and with mayors of neighbouring towns. He was the only independent politician in the suburb and avoided entering the ideological war between socialists and communists.

Independent Deputy for Seine
In the 1924 legislative elections, the SFIO and the Radicals formed a national coalition, known as the Cartel des Gauches. Laval headed a list of independent socialists in the Seine. The Cartel won, and Laval regained a seat in the National Assembly. His first act was to bring back Joseph Caillaux, a former Prime Minister, Cabinet member and member of the National Assembly who had once been the star of the Radical Party. Clemenceau had had Caillaux arrested toward the end of the war for collusion with the enemy. Caillaux spent two years in prison and lost his civic rights. Laval successfully fought for Caillaux's pardon, and Caillaux became an influential patron.

Member of government

Minister and senator
Laval's reward for support of the Cartel was appointment as Minister of Public Works in the government of Paul Painlevé in April 1925, but six months later, the government collapsed. Laval from then on belonged to the club of former ministers from which new ministers were drawn. Between 1925 and 1926, Laval participated three more times in governments of Aristide Briand, once as under-secretary to the Prime Minister and twice as Minister of Justice (garde des sceaux). When he first became Minister of Justice, Laval abandoned his law practice to avoid a conflict of interest.

Laval's momentum was frozen after 1926 by a reshuffling of the Cartel majority orchestrated by the Radical-Socialist mayor and deputy of Lyon, Édouard Herriot. Founded in 1901, the Radical Party became the hinge faction of the Third Republic, and its support or defection often meant the survival or the collapse of governments. Through that latest swing, Laval was excluded from the government of France for four years. Author Gaston Jacquemin suggested that Laval chose not to partake in a Herriot government, which he judged to be incapable of handling the financial crisis. Although 1926 marked the definitive break between Laval and the left, he maintained friends on the left.

In 1927, Laval was elected Senator for the Seine, which withdrew him from and placed himself above the political battles for majorities in the Chamber of Deputies. He longed for a constitutional reform to strengthen the executive branch and to eliminate political instability, a major flaw of the Third Republic.

On 2 March 1930, Laval returned as Minister of Labour in the second André Tardieu government. Tardieu and Laval knew each other from the days of Clemenceau and had come to appreciate each other's qualities. Tardieu needed men he could trust since his previous government had collapsed a little over a week earlier because of the defection of Labour Minister Louis Loucheur. However, when the Radical Socialist Camille Chautemps failed to form a viable government, Tardieu was called back.

Personal investments
From 1927 to 1930, Laval began to accumulate a sizeable personal fortune. After the war, his wealth resulted in charges that he had used his political position to line his own pockets. "I have always thought", he wrote to the examining magistrate on 11 September 1945, "that a soundly based material independence, if not indispensable, gives those statesmen who possess it a much greater political independence". Until 1927, his principal source of income had been his fees as a lawyer and in that year, they totalled 113,350 francs, according to his income tax returns. Between August 1927 and June 1930, he undertook large-scale investments in various enterprises that totalled 51 million francs. Not all of that money was his own, but some came from a group of financiers that had the backing of an investment trust, the Union Syndicale et Financière, as well as two banks, the Comptoir Lyon Allemand and the Banque Nationale de Crédit.

Two of the investments that Laval and his backers acquired were provincial newspapers, Le Moniteur du Puy-de-Dôme and its associated printing works at Clermont-Ferrand, and the Lyon Républicain. The circulation of the Moniteur had stood at 27,000 in 1926 before Laval took it over. By 1933, it had more than doubled, peaking at 58,250 but declining thereafter. Profits varied, but during the 17 years of his control, Laval earned some 39 million francs in income from the paper and the printing works combined. The renewed plant was valued at 50 million francs, which led the High Court expert in 1945 to say with some justification that it had been "an excellent deal for him".

Minister of Labour and Social Insurance
More than 150,000 textile workers were on strike, and violence was feared. As Minister of Public Works in 1925, Laval had ended the strike of mine workers. Tardieu hoped he could do the same as Minister of Labour. The conflict was settled without bloodshed. The Socialist politician Léon Blum, never one of Laval's allies, conceded that Laval's "intervention was skilful, opportune and decisive".

Social insurance had been on the agenda for ten years. It had passed the Chamber of Deputies but not the Senate, in 1928. Tardieu gave Laval until May Day to get the project through. The date was chosen to stifle the agitation of Labour Day. Laval's first effort went into clarifying the muddled collection of texts. He then consulted employer and labour organisations. Laval had to reconcile the divergent views of Chamber and Senate. "Had it not been for Laval's unwearying patience", Laval's associate Tissier wrote, "an agreement would never have been achieved".
In two months, Laval presented the Assembly a text that overcame its original failure. It met the financial constraints, reduced the control of the government and preserved the choice of doctors and their billing freedom. The Chamber and the Senate passed the law with an overwhelming majority.

When the bill had passed its final stages, Tardieu described his Minister of Labour as "displaying at every moment of the discussion as much tenacity as restraint and ingenuity".

First Laval government

Tardieu's government ultimately proved unable to weather the Oustric Affair. After the failure of the Oustric Bank, it appeared that members of the government had improper ties to it. The scandal involved Justice Minister Raoul Péret and Under-Secretaries Henri Falcoz and Eugène Lautier. Tardieu had not been involved, but on 4 December 1930, he lost his majority in the Senate. President Gaston Doumergue called on Louis Barthou to form a government, but Barthou failed to do so. Doumergue turned to Laval, who fared no better. The following month, the government that was formed by Théodore Steeg floundered.

Doumergue renewed his offer to Laval. On 27 January 1931, Laval successfully formed his first government.

In the words of its leader, Léon Blum, the Socialist opposition was amazed and disappointed that the ghost of Tardieu's government had reappeared within a few weeks of being defeated with Laval at its head "like a night bird surprised by the light". Laval's nomination as prime minister led to speculation that Tardieu, the new agriculture minister, held the real power in the government.

Although Laval thought highly of Tardieu and Briand and applied policies in line with theirs, however, Laval was not Tardieu's mouthpiece. Ministers who formed the Laval government were in great part those who had formed Tardieu's governments but that was a function of the composite majority thaf Laval could find at the National Assembly. Raymond Poincaré, Aristide Briand and Tardieu had offered ministerial posts to Herriot's Radicals but to no avail.

Besides Briand, André Maginot, Pierre-Étienne Flandin and Paul Reynaud, Laval brought in as his advisors, friends such as Maurice Foulon from Aubervilliers and Pierre Cathala. Laval had known Cathala in Bayonne, and Cathala had worked in Laval's Labour Ministry. Cathala began as Under-Secretary of the Interior and was appointed as Minister of the Interior in January 1932. Blaise Diagne of Senegal, the first African deputy, had been elected to the National Assembly at the same time as Laval in 1914. Laval invited Diagne to join his cabinet as Under-Secretary to the Colonies. Diagne was the first Black African appointed to a cabinet position in a French government. Laval also called on financial experts such as Jacques Rueff, Charles Rist and Adéodat Boissard. André François-Poncet was appointed as Laval's Under-Secretary and then as ambassador to Germany. Laval's government included an economist, Claude-Joseph Gignoux, when economists in government service were still rare.

France in 1931 was unaffected by the world economic crisis. Laval declared on embarking for the United States on 16 October 1931, "France remained healthy thanks to work and savings". Agriculture, small industry and protectionism were the bases of France's economy. With a conservative policy of contained wages and limited social services, France had accumulated the largest gold reserves in the world after the United States. France reaped the benefit of devaluation of the franc that had been orchestrated by Poincaré, which made French products competitive on the world market. In all of France, only 12,000 people were recorded as unemployed.

Laval and his cabinet considered the economy and gold reserves as means to diplomatic ends. Laval left to visit London; Berlin; and Washington, DC. He attended conferences on the world crisis, war reparations and debt, disarmament and the gold standard.

Role in 1931 Austrian financial crisis
In 1931, Austria underwent a banking crisis when its largest bank, the Creditanstalt, was revealed to be nearly bankrupt. That threatened a worldwide financial crisis, and world leaders began negotiating the terms for an international loan to Austria's central government to sustain its financial system. However, Laval blocked the proposed package for nationalist reasons and demanded for France to receive a series of diplomatic concessions in exchange for its support, including renunciation of a prospective German-Austrian customs union. That proved to be fatal for the negotiations, which ultimately fell through. As a result, the Creditanstalt declared bankruptcy on 11 May 1931 and precipitated a crisis that quickly spread to other nations. Within four days, bank runs in Budapest, Hungary, were underway, and bank failures began spreading to Germany, Britain and elsewhere.

Hoover Moratorium
The Hoover Moratorium on 20 June 1931, a proposal made by US President Herbert Hoover to freeze all intergovernmental debt repayments for a one-year period, was according to the author and political advisor McGeorge Bundy "the most significant action taken by an American president for Europe since Woodrow Wilson's administration."  The United States had enormous stakes in Germany since long-term German borrowers owed the US private sector more than $1.25 billion, and the short-term debt neared $1 billion. By comparison, the entire US national income in 1931 was only $54 billion. To put that into perspective, the authors Walter Lippmann and William O. Scroggs stated in The United States in World Affairs, an Account of American Foreign Relations, that "the American stake in Germany's government and private obligations was equal to half that of all the rest of the world combined".

The proposed moratorium would also benefit Britain's investment in Germany's private sector by making more likely that those loans would be repaid while the public indebtedness was frozen. It was in Hoover's interest to offer aid to an ailing British economy in the light of the British debt to the United States. France, on the other hand, had a relatively small stake in Germany's private debt but a huge interest in German reparations, and payments to France would be compromised under the Hoover Moratorium.

The scheme was further complicated by ill timing; the perception of collusion by the Americans, British and Germans; and its breaching of the Young Plan. Such breach could be approved in France only by the National Assembly, and the survival of Laval's government rested on the legislature's approval of the moratorium. Seventeen days elapsed between the proposal and the vote of confidence in the legislature. That delay was blamed for the lack of success of the Hoover Moratorium although the US Congress did not approve it until December 1931.

In support of the Hoover Moratorium, Laval undertook a year of personal and direct diplomacy by which he traveled to London, Berlin and Washington. There were considerable domestic achievements to his name, but his international efforts were short on results. British Prime Minister Ramsay MacDonald and British Foreign Secretary Arthur Henderson were preoccupied by internal political divisions and the collapse of the pound sterling and so were unable to help. German Chancellor Heinrich Brüning and Foreign Minister Julius Curtius were eager for Franco-German reconciliation but were under siege on all sides. They faced a very weak economy, which made meeting the government payroll a weekly miracle. Private bankruptcies and constant layoffs had the Communists on a short fuse. At the other end of the political spectrum, the German Army spied on the Brüning cabinet and fed information to Der Stahlhelm and the National Socialists, which effectively froze any overtures towards France.

In the United States, the conference between Hoover and Laval was an exercise in mutual frustration. Hoover's plan for a reduced military had been rebuffed, albeit gently. A solution to the Danzig Corridor problem had been retracted. The concept of introducing a silver standard for countries that left the gold standard was viewed by Laval and François Albert-Buisson as a frivolous proposal. Hoover thought that it might have helped "Mexico, India, China and South America", but Laval dismissed the silver solution as an inflationary proposition and added that "it was cheaper to inflate paper."

Laval did not get a security pact without which the French would never consider disarmament, and he did not obtain an endorsement for the political moratorium. The promise to match any reduction of German reparations with a decrease of the French debt was not put in the communiqué. The joint statement declared the attachment of France and the United States to the gold standard.

Both governments also agreed that the Banque de France and the Federal Reserve would consult each other before transfers of gold. That was welcome news after the run on American gold in the preceding weeks.  In light of the financial crisis, the leaders agreed to review the economic situation in Germany before the Hoover Moratorium had run its course.

There were meagre political results. The Hoover–Laval encounter, however, had other effects by making Laval more widely known and raising his standing in the United States and France. The American and French press were smitten.  His optimism was such a contrast to his grim-sounding international contemporaries that in Time magazine named him as the 1931 Man of the Year, an honour that had never bestowed before on a Frenchman. Laval followed Mohandas K. Gandhi and preceded Franklin D. Roosevelt in receiving the honour.

Pre-war
The second Cartel des Gauches resigned after the 6 February 1934 crisis had involved anti-parliamentarist groups of far-right leagues, veterans organizations and the French Communist Party(PCF). Laval and Marshal Philippe Pétain had contacts with some conservative politicians among the groups involved. Laval became Minister of Colonies in the new conservative government of Gaston Doumergue. In October, Foreign Minister Louis Barthou was assassinated. Laval succeeded him and held that office until 1936.

Laval was then opposed to Germany, the "hereditary enemy" of France, and pursued anti-German alliances. He met with Mussolini in Rome, and both signed the Franco-Italian Agreement on 4 January 1935. It ceded parts of French Somaliland to Italy and allowed it a free hand in Abyssinia in exchange for support against any German aggression. Laval denied that he had given Mussolini a free hand in Abyssinia and even wrote to Il Duce on the subject. Also in January, Laval became the first member of a French Government to visit the Vatican since Napoleon; he was enthusiastically received by Pope Pius XI, and awarded with the Grand Cross of the Order of Pius IX. In April 1935, Laval persuaded Italy and Britain to join France in the Stresa Front against German ambitions in Austria. On 2 May 1935, he likewise signed the Franco-Soviet Treaty of Mutual Assistance.

Laval's primary aim before the Italo-Abyssinian War was to retain Italy as an anti-German power and to avoid driving it into Germany's hands by adopting a hostile attitude to an invasion of Abyssinia. According to the British historian Correlli Barnett, in Laval's view, "all that really mattered was Nazi Germany.  His eyes were on the demilitarised zone of the Rhineland; his thoughts on the Locarno guarantees.  To estrange Italy, one of the Locarno powers, over such a question as Abyssinia did not appeal to Laval's Auvergnat peasant mind".

In June 1935, Laval became Prime Minister as well. In October 1935, Laval and British Foreign Minister Samuel Hoare proposed a realpolitik solution to the Abyssinia Crisis.  After its leak to the media in December, the Hoare–Laval Pact was widely denounced as appeasement of Mussolini. Laval was forced to resign on 22 January 1936, and was driven completely out of ministerial politics. The victory of the Popular Front in the 1936 French legislative election meant that Laval was out of power, but he had a left-wing government to target in his media.

Vichy France

Formation of government
During the Phoney War, Laval was cautiously ambivalent towards the conflict. He was on record as saying in March 1940 that although the war could have been avoided by diplomatic means, it was now up to the government to prosecute it with the utmost vigour.

As far as General Maxime Weygand was concerned, "if the Germans crossed the Seine and the Marne, it was the end". Simultaneously, Marshal Philippe Pétain was increasing the pressure upon Prime Minister Paul Reynaud to call for an armistice. Meanwhile, Laval was in Châteldon. On 10 June, in view of the German advance, the government left Paris for Tours. Weygand had informed Reynaud that "the final rupture of our lines may take place at any time". Then, "our forces would continue to fight until their strength and resources were extinguished. But their disintegration would be no more than a matter of time". Weygand had avoided using the word "armistice", but it was on the minds of all of those who were involved and was opposed to by Reynaud.

Laval had meanwhile left Châteldon for Bordeaux, where his daughter nearly convinced him of the necessity of going to the United States. Instead, it was reported that he was sending "messengers and messengers" to Pétain.

As the Germans occupied Paris, Pétain was asked to form a new government. To everyone's surprise, he produced a list of his ministers, which was convincing proof that he had been expecting and had been prepared for the President's summons. When he was informed that he was to be appointed Minister of Justice, Laval's temper and ambitions became apparent as he ferociously demanded of Pétain, despite the objections of other men of government, to make him Minister of Foreign Affairs. Laval realised that only through that position could he effect a reversal of alliances and bring himself to favour with Nazi Germany, the military power that he viewed as the inevitable victor. However, Permanent Under-Secretary François Charles-Roux refused to serve under Laval. One consequence of those events was that Laval was later able to claim that he had not been part of the government that requested the armistice. His name did not appear in the chronicles of events until June, when he began to assume a more active role in criticising the government's decision to leave France for North Africa.

Although the final terms of the armistice were harsh, the French colonial empire was left untouched, the French Navy was maintained, and the French government was nominally allowed to administer the occupied and unoccupied zones if it obeyed German directives. The concept of "collaboration" had been written into the Armistice Convention before Laval joined the government. The French representatives who affixed their signatures to the text accepted the term:

In Vichy government, 1940–1941

By then, there was very little left of Laval the socialist. He now openly sympathized with National Socialism and was convinced that Germany would win the war. For that reason, Laval felt France needed to emulate the Third Reich and its totalitarian regime as much as possible. To that end, when he was included in the Cabinet as minister of state, Laval set about with the work for which he is remembered: dismantling the Third Republic and its democracy and taking up the fascist cause.

In October 1940, Laval understood collaboration more or less in the same sense as Pétain. For both, that meant giving up the least possible to get the most in return. Laval, in his role of go-between, was forced to be in constant touch with the German authorities, to shift ground, to be wily and to plan ahead. All of that under the circumstances drew more attention to him than to the Marshal and made him appear to many Frenchmen as "the agent of collaboration", and to others, he was "the Germans' man".

The meetings between Pétain and Adolf Hitler and between Laval and Hitler are often used as evidence of Vichy collaboration with the Nazis. In fact, Montoire (24–26 October 1940) was a disappointment to both sides. Hitler wanted France to declare war on Britain, and the French wanted improved relations with their conqueror. Neither happened, and virtually the only concession that the French obtained was the 'Berlin Protocol' of 16 November 1940, which provided for the release of certain categories of French prisoners-of-war.

In November 1940, Laval took a number of pro-German decisions of his own, without consulting with colleagues.  The most notorious examples concerned turning the RTB Bor copper mines and the Belgian gold reserves over to German control. After the war, Laval's justification, apart from a denial that he acted unilaterally, was that Vichy was powerless to prevent the Germans from gaining something that they were clearly so eager to obtain.

Laval's actions were a factor in his dismissal on 13 December 1940. Pétain asked all of the ministers to sign a collective letter of resignation during a full cabinet meeting. Laval did so since he thought that it was a device to get rid of Labour Minister M. Belin. Laval was therefore stunned when Pétain announced, "the resignations of MM. Laval and Ripert are accepted". That evening, Laval was arrested and driven by the police to his home in Châteldon. The following day, Pétain announced his decision to remove Laval from the government. The reason was a fundamental incompatibility with Pétain. Laval's methods of working appeared slovenly to Petain's precise military mind, and Laval showed a marked lack of deference, as instanced by a habit of blowing cigarette smoke in Pétain's face. By doing so, he aroused Pétain's irritation and the anger of the entire cabinet.

On 27 August 1941, several top Vichyites, including Laval, attended a review of the Légion des Volontaires Français (LVF), a collaborationist militia. Paul Collette, a member of the Croix-de-Feu, shot Laval (and also Marcel Déat, another prominent collaborationist), during a troop revue and slightly wounded him, but Laval soon recovered from the injury.

Return to power, 1942

Laval returned to power in April 1942. In a radio speech on 22 June 1942, Laval outlined his policy objectives by expressing his "desire to re-establish normal and trusting relations with Germany and Italy". He added he "wished for a German victory" because otherwise "Bolshevism [would] establish itself everywhere". Laval had been in power for a mere two months when he was faced with the decision of providing forced labour to Germany, which was short of skilled labour because it needed troop replacements on the Eastern Front. Unlike other occupied countries, France was technically protected by the armistice, and its workers could not be simply rounded up for transportation. In the occupied zone, the Germans used intimidation and the control of raw materials to create unemployment and thus create reasons for French labourers to volunteer to work in Germany. Laval received German demands to send more than 300,000 skilled labourers immediately to factories in Germany. Laval delayed by making a counteroffer of one worker in return for one French prisoners-of-war. The proposal was sent to Hitler, and a compromise was reached that one prisoner-of-war would be repatriated for every three workers arriving in Germany.

Laval's precise role in the deportation of Jews has been hotly debated by both his accusers and his defenders.The Germans never told the Vichy French authorities about the extermination camps; instead, the French were told that Jews were being deported as forced labour for the Axis war effort. When ordered to have all Jews in France rounded up to be transported to German-occupied Poland, Laval negotiated a compromise by allowing only Jews who were not French citizens to be forfeited to German control. It was estimated that by the end of the war, the Germans had killed 90% of the Jewish population in other occupied countries, but in France, 50% of the prewar French and foreign Jewish population, with perhaps 90% of the purely-French Jewish population still remaining alive. Laval went beyond the orders given to him by the Germans, as he included Jewish children under 16, whom the Germans had given him permission to spare, in the deportations. In his book Churches and the Holocaust, Mordecai Paldiel claims that when the Protestant leader Marc Boegner visited Laval to remonstrate, Laval claimed that he had ordered children to be deported along with their parents because families should not be separated, and "children should remain with their parents". According to Paldiel, when Boegner argued that the children would almost certainly die, Laval replied that "not one [Jewish child] must remain in France". Sarah Fishman in a reliably-sourced book but lacking citations wrote that Laval also attempted to prevent Jewish children gaining visas to the United States that had arranged by the American Friends Service Committee and that Laval was committed less to expelling Jewish children from France than to making sure they reached Nazi camps.

More and more, the insoluble dilemma of collaboration faced Laval and his chief of staff, Jean Jardin. Laval had to maintain Vichy's authority to prevent Germany from installing a puppet government, which would be made up of French Nazis such as Jacques Doriot.

Leader of the Milice, 1943–1945
In 1943, Laval became the nominal leader of the newly-created Milice, but its operational leader was Secretary General Joseph Darnand.

When the Allied landings in French North Africa (Operation Torch) began, the Wehrmacht occupied the Zone libre. Hitler continued to ask whether the French government was prepared to fight at his side and required Vichy to declare war against Britain. Laval and Pétain agreed to maintain a firm refusal. During that time and the Normandy landings in 1944, Laval was in a struggle against ultracollaborationist ministers.

In a speech broadcast during the Normandy landings, Laval appealed to the nation:

About two months later, he and some others were arrested by the Germans and transported to Belfort, where they arrived on 19 August 1944.  
In view of the speed of the Allied advance, what was left of the Vichy government was moved on 7 September 1944 from Belfort to the Sigmaringen enclave in Germany. Pétain took residence at the Hohenzollern castle in Sigmaringen. At first, Laval also resided in that castle. In January 1945 Laval was assigned to the Stauffenberg castle in Wilflingen, 12 km outside the Sigmaringen enclave. By April 1945, US General George S. Patton's army approached Sigmaringen and so the Vichy ministers were forced to seek their own refuge. Laval received permission to enter Spain and was flown to Barcelona by a Luftwaffe plane. However, 90 days later, Charles de Gaulle pressured Spain to expel Laval. The same Luftwaffe plane that had flown him to Spain then flew him to the American-occupied zone of Austria. The American authorities immediately arrested Laval and his wife and turned them over to the Free French. They were flown to Paris to be imprisoned at Fresnes Prison. Madame Laval was later released, but Pierre Laval remained in prison to be tried for treason.

Prior to his arrest, Laval had planned to move to Sintra, Portugal, where a house had been leased for him.

Trial and execution
Two trials were to be held. Although it had its faults, the Pétain trial permitted the presentation and examination of a vast amount of pertinent material. Scholars including Robert Paxton and Geoffrey Warner believe that Laval's trial demonstrated the inadequacies of the judicial system and the poisonous political atmosphere of that purge-trial era. During his imprisonment pending the verdict of his treason trial, Laval wrote his only book, the posthumously-published Diary (1948). His daughter, Josée de Chambrun, smuggled it out of the prison page by page.

Laval firmly believed that he would be able to convince his fellow countrymen that he had been acting in their best interests all along. "Father-in-law wants a big trial which will illuminate everything", René de Chambrun told Laval's lawyers: "If he is given time to prepare his defence, if he is allowed to speak, to call witnesses and to obtain from abroad the information and documents which he needs, he will confound his accusers". "Do you want me to tell you the setup?" Laval asked one of his lawyers on 4 August. "There will be no pre-trial hearings and no trial. I will be condemned – and got rid of – before the elections".

Laval's trial began at 1:30 pm on Thursday, 4 October 1945. He was charged with plotting against the security of the State and intelligence (collaboration) with the enemy. He had three defence lawyers (Jaques Baraduc, Albert Naud and Yves-Frédéric Jaffré). None of his lawyers had met him before. He dealt mostly with Jaffré, who sat with him, talked, listened and took down notes that he wanted to dictate. Baraduc, who quickly became convinced of Laval's innocence, kept contact with the Chambruns and at first shared their conviction that Laval would be acquitted or at most would receive a sentence of temporary exile. Naud, who had been a member of the Resistance, believed Laval to be guilty and urged him to plead that he had made grave errors but had acted under constraint. Laval would not listen to him and was convinced that he was innocent and could prove it. "He acted", said Naud, "as if his career, not his life, was at stake".

All three of his lawyers declined to be in court to hear the reading of the formal charges: "We fear that the haste which has been employed to open the hearings is inspired, not by judicial preoccupations, but motivated by political considerations". In lieu of attending the hearing, they sent letters stating the shortcomings and asked to be discharged as counsel. The court carried on without them. The president of the court, Pierre Mongibeaux, announced that the trial had to be completed before the general election scheduled for 21 October. Mongibeaux and Mornet, the public prosecutor, were unable to control constant hostile outbursts from the jury. They occurred as heated exchanges between Mongibeaux and Laval became louder and louder. On the third day, Laval's three lawyers were with him as the President of the Bar Association had advised them to resume their duties.

After the adjournment, Mongibeaux announced that the part of the interrogation dealing with the charge of plotting against the security of the state was concluded. To the charge of collaboration, Laval replied, "Monsieur le Président, the insulting way in which you questioned me earlier and the demonstrations in which some members of the jury indulged show me that I may be the victim of a judicial crime. I do not want to be an accomplice; I prefer to remain silent". Mongibeaux called the first of the prosecution witnesses, but they had not expected to testify so soon, and none was present. Mongibeaux adjourned the hearing for the second time so that the witnesses could be located. When the court reassembled half an hour later, Laval was no longer in his place.

Although Pierre-Henri Teitgen, the Minister of Justice in Charles de Gaulle's cabinet, personally appealed to Laval's lawyers to have him attend the hearings, he declined to do so. Teitgen freely confirmed the conduct of Mongibeaux and Mornet and professed that he was unable to do anything to curb them. A sentence of death was handed down in Laval's absence. His lawyers were refused a retrial.

The execution was fixed for the morning of 15 October at Fresnes Prison. Laval attempted to commit suicide before the sentence could be carried out by taking poison from a vial stitched inside the lining of his jacket. He did not intend, he explained in a suicide note, that French soldiers should become accomplices in a "judicial crime". The poison, however, was so old that it was ineffective and so repeated stomach-pumpings revived Laval. Laval requested for his lawyers to witness his execution. He was shot and shouted, "Vive la France!". "It is not the French way to try a man without letting him speak," Laval's wife declared to an English newspaper, "That's the way he always fought against – the German way."

His corpse was initially buried in an unmarked grave in the Thiais cemetery until it was buried in the Chambrun family mausoleum at the Montparnasse Cemetery in November 1945.

His daughter, Josée Laval, wrote a letter to Winston Churchill in 1948 and suggested that the firing squad who killed her father "wore British uniforms". The letter was published in the June 1949 issue of Human Events, an American conservative newspaper.

The High Court, which functioned until 1949, judged 108 cases and pronounced eight death penalties, including one for an elderly Pétain, whose appeal failed. Only three of the death penalties were carried out: those of Laval; Fernand de Brinon, Vichy's Ambassador in Paris to the German authorities; and Joseph Darnand, the head of the Milice.

Governments

Laval's First Ministry, 27 January 1931 – 14 January 1932
Pierre Laval – President of the Council and Minister of the Interior
Léon Bérard – Vice-President of the Council and Minister of Justice
Aristide Briand – Minister of Foreign Affairs
André Maginot – Minister of War
Charles Dumont – Minister of Marine
Jacques-Louis Dumesnil – Minister of Air
Mario Roustan – Minister of Public Instruction and Fine Arts
Pierre Étienne Flandin – Minister of Finance
François Piétri – Minister of Budget
Maurice Deligne – Minister of Public Works
Louis Rollin – Minister of Commerce and Industry
André Tardieu – Minister of Agriculture
Louis de Chappedelaine – Minister of Merchant Marine
Auguste Champetier de Ribes – Minister of Pensions
Adolphe Landry – Minister of Labour and Social Security Provisions
Camille Blaisot – Minister of Public Health
Charles Guernier – Minister of Posts, Telegraphs, and Telephones
Paul Reynaud – Minister of Colonies

Changes
A few changes after Aristide Briand's retirement and the death of André Maginot on 7 January 1932:
War: André Tardieu
Interieur: Pierre Cathala
Agriculture: Achille Fould
André François-Poncet upon becoming ambassador to Germany was replaced by C.J. Gignoux.

Laval's Second Ministry, 14 January – 20 February 1932
Pierre Laval – President of the Council and Minister of Foreign Affairs
André Tardieu – Minister of War
Pierre Cathala – Minister of the Interior
Pierre-Étienne Flandin – Minister of Finance
François Piétri – Minister of Budget
Adolphe Landry – Minister of Labour and Social Security Provisions
Léon Bérard – Minister of Justice
Charles Dumont – Minister of Marine
Louis de Chappedelaine – Minister of Merchant Marine
Jacques-Louis Dumesnil – Minister of Air
Mario Roustan – Minister of Public Instruction and Fine Arts
Auguste Champetier de Ribes – Minister of Pensions
Achille Fould – Minister of Agriculture
Paul Reynaud – Minister of Colonies
Maurice Deligne – Minister of Public Works
Camille Blaisot – Minister of Public Health
Charles Guernier – Minister of Posts, Telegraphs, and Telephones
Louis Rollin – Minister of Commerce and Industry

Laval's Third Ministry, 7 June 1935 – 24 January 1936
Pierre Laval – President of the Council and Minister of Foreign Affairs
Jean Fabry – Minister of War
Joseph Paganon – Minister of the Interior
Marcel Régnier – Minister of Finance
Ludovic-Oscar Frossard – Minister of Labour
Léon Bérard – Minister of Justice
François Piétri – Minister of Marine
Mario Roustan – Minister of Merchant Marine
Victor Denain – Minister of Air
Philippe Marcombes – Minister of National Education
Henri Maupoil – Minister of Pensions
Pierre Cathala – Minister of Agriculture
Louis Rollin – Minister of Colonies
Laurent Eynac – Minister of Public Works
Ernest Lafont – Minister of Public Health and Physical Education
Georges Mandel – Minister of Posts, Telegraphs, and Telephones
Georges Bonnet – Minister of Commerce and Industry
Édouard Herriot – Minister of State
Louis Marin – Minister of State
Pierre Étienne Flandin – Minister of State

Changes
17 June 1935 – Mario Roustan succeeds Marcombes (d. 13 June) as Minister of National Education. William Bertrand succeeds Roustan as Minister of Merchant Marine.

Laval's Ministry in the Vichy Government, 18 April 1942 – 20 August 1944
Pierre Laval – President of the Council, Minister of Foreign Affairs, Minister of the Interior, and Minister of Information
Eugène Bridoux – Minister of War
Pierre Cathala – Minister of Finance and National Economy
Jean Bichelonne – Minister of Industrial Production
Hubert Lagardelle – Minister of Labour
Joseph Barthélemy – Minister of Justice
Gabriel Auphan – Minister of Marine
Jean-François Jannekeyn – Minister of Air
Abel Bonnard – Minister of National Education
Jacques Le Roy Ladurie – Minister of Agriculture
Max Bonnafous – Minister of Supply
Jules Brévié – Minister of Colonies
Raymond Grasset – Minister of Family and Health
Robert Gibrat – Minister of Communication
Lucien Romier – Minister of State

Changes
11 September 1942 – Max Bonnafous succeeds Le Roy Ladurie as Minister of Agriculture, remaining also Minister of Supply
18 November 1942 – Jean-Charles Abrial succeeds Auphan as Minister of Marine. Jean Bichelonne succeeds Gibrat as Minister of Communication, remaining also Minister of Industrial Production.
26 March 1943 – Maurice Gabolde succeeds Barthélemy as Minister of Justice. Henri Bléhaut succeeds Abrial as Minister of Marine and Brévié as Minister of Colonies.
21 November 1943 – Jean Bichelonne succeeds Lagardelle as Minister of Labour, remaining also Minister of Industrial Production and Communication.
31 December 1943 – Minister of State Lucien Romier resigns from the government.
6 January 1944 – Pierre Cathala succeeds Bonnafous as Minister of Agriculture and Supply, remaining also Minister of Finance and National Economy.
3 March 1944 – The office of Minister of Supply is abolished. Pierre Cathala remains Minister of Finance, National Economy, and Agriculture.
16 March 1944 – Marcel Déat succeeds Bichelonne as Minister of Labour and National Solidarity. Bichelonne remains Minister of Industrial Production and Communication.

References

Further reading

Critical of Laval
Tissier, Pierre, I worked with Laval, London: George Harrap & Co, 1942
Torrés, Henry, Pierre Laval (Translated by Norbert Guterman), New York: Oxford University Press, 1941
Bois, Elie J., Truth on the Tragedy of France, (London, 1941)
Pétain-Laval The Conspiracy, With a Foreword by Viscount Cecil, London: Constable, 1942
Marrus, Michael & Paxton, Robert O. Vichy France and the Jews, New York: Basic Books New York 1981,

Post-war defences of Laval
Julien Clermont (pseudonym for Georges Hilaire), L'Homme qu'il fallait tuer (Paris, 1949)
Jacques Guerard, Criminel de Paix (Paris, 1953)
Michel Letan, Pierre Laval de l'armistice au poteau (Paris, 1947)
Alfred Mallet, Pierre Laval (Paris, 1955)
Maurice Privat, Pierre Laval, cet inconnu (Paris, 1948)
René de Chambrun, Pierre Laval, Traitor or Patriot?, (New York) 1984; and Mission and Betrayal, (London, 1993).
Whitcomb, Philip W., France During The German Occupation 1940–1944, Stanford, California: Stanford University Press, 1957, In three vol.

Books by Laval's lawyers
Baraduc, Jaques, Dans la Cellule de Pierre Laval, Paris: Editions Self, 1948
Jaffré, Yves-Frédéric, Les Derniers Propos de Pierre Laval, Paris: Andre Bonne, 1953
Naud, Albert, Pourquoi je n'ai pas défendu Pierre Laval, Paris: Fayard 1948

Full biographies
Cointet, Jean-Paul, Pierre Laval, Paris: Fayard, 1993
Cole, Hubert, Laval, New York: G. P. Putnam's Sons, 1963
Kupferman, Fred, Laval 1883–1945, Paris: Flammarion, 1988
Pourcher, Yves, Pierre Laval vu par sa fille, Paris: Le Grande Livre du Mois, 2002
Warner, Geoffrey, Pierre Laval and the eclipse of France, New York: The Macmillan Company, 1968

Other biographical material
 .
 .
  on the Laval treason trial, 15 Oct 1945.
  on Laval's testimony in Petain's trial, 13 Aug 1945.
 .
 .
 .
 .
 .
 .
 .
Curtis, Michael, Verdict on Vichy, New York: Arcade, 2002
 .
Farmer, Paul, Vichy – Political Dilemma, London: Oxford University Press, 1955
 .
 .
 .
 .
 .
.
 .
 .
 .
 .
 .
 .
 .
 .
 .
 .
 .
 .
 .
 .

External links
 
 .
 .
 
 .
 

 
1883 births
1945 deaths
Executed French collaborators with Nazi Germany
20th-century French lawyers
French Section of the Workers' International politicians
French Ministers of Overseas France
French interior ministers
French Senators of the Third Republic
Senators of Seine (department)
Senators of Puy-de-Dôme
People of Vichy France
World War II political leaders
Holocaust perpetrators in France
People executed by the Provisional Government of the French Republic
People from Puy-de-Dôme
Politicians from Auvergne-Rhône-Alpes
Government ministers of France
Knights Grand Cross of the Order of Pope Pius IX
Members of the 11th Chamber of Deputies of the French Third Republic
Members of the 13th Chamber of Deputies of the French Third Republic
Transport ministers of France
Ministers of Information of France
Prime Ministers of France
Heads of government who were later imprisoned
Executed people from Auvergne
Executed prime ministers
French fascists
French politicians convicted of crimes
Former Marxists
Time Person of the Year
20th-century executions for treason
Burials at Montparnasse Cemetery
Executed mass murderers